The golden Argentino was the only official golden coins made by the argentine Casa de Moneda from 1881 to 1896, according to law N° 1130, sanctioned in 1881 during Julio Argentino Roca's presidency.

Gold currency

The Argentino was an Argentine currency equal to 5 pesos oro sellado.

The  argentino coin was issued in 1881 and 1884 and it weighs 4.0322 grams. The argentino coin was issued from 1881 to 1896 and it weighs 8.0645 grams. Both were made of gold 0.900.

Planned currency

The Argentino was a complementary currency in Argentina announced by then-president Adolfo Rodríguez Saá on December 26, 2001 during the Argentine economic crisis. It would have circulated alongside the peso and the dollar. He resigned on December 30, 2001 and this plan was never implemented.

The currency was to replace the Patacón, the LECOP and other provincial bonds.

References

Sources

 

Argentino
Proposed currencies